Jerry Morse-Karzen (born 1950s) is an American former professional tennis player.

A native of Illinois, Karzen is a New Trier High School alumnus and during the early 1970s played collegiate tennis for the University of Michigan. He competed professionally after college, featuring in the doubles main draws of the French Open, Wimbledon and the US Open. His doubles partner on tour was often former Michigan teammate Eric Friedler.

Karzen, the father of four children, competes in USTA father-son/father-daughter championships with son Brett and daughter Becky, combining for 42 national titles (as of April 2016).

ATP Challenger titles

Doubles: (1)

References

External links
 
 

Year of birth missing (living people)
Living people
American male tennis players
Michigan Wolverines men's tennis players
Tennis people from Illinois
People from Winnetka, Illinois
1950s births